The European Union of Gymnastics organises European Gymnastics Championships for each of the following gymnastics disciplines:

Events

Current

Defunct

All-time medal table 
Notes

Countries are ranked by number of gold, silver and bronze medals, respectively. 
Results from junior and age group events were not taken into consideration.
Detailed results from the European Acrobatics Championships are not currently available; therefore, only confirmed total medals for a select number of countries have been added to the table. 
Silver and bronze medals earned at the European Trampoline Championships from 1969 to 1981 are not known at the moment. 
Defunct NOCs are listed in italics.
Last updated after the 2020 European Women's Artistic Gymnastics Championships

See also

Gymnastics at the European Games

Gymnastics competitions
Recurring sporting events established in 1955